Ulazorsky is a rural locality (a settlement) in Voskresenskoye Rural Settlement, Cherepovetsky District, Vologda Oblast, Russia. The population was 83 as of 2002.

Geography 
Ulazorsky is located 75 km northwest of Cherepovets (the district's administrative centre) by road. Kozlovo is the nearest rural locality.

References 

Rural localities in Cherepovetsky District